The Ministry of Gender Equality and Social Welfare is a department of the Namibian government. It was established in 2000 under the name Ministry of Women Affairs and Child Welfare, before that the portfolio was a directorate in the Office of the President. The first minister was Netumbo Nandi-Ndaitwah. In 2005 the ministry was renamed Ministry of Gender Equality and Child Welfare (MGECW). 

In 2020 the ministry was merged with the Ministry of Poverty Eradication and Social Welfare, and renamed Ministry of Gender Equality, Poverty Eradication and Social Welfare (MGEPESW). Since then it falls under the Office of the President. It still has a dedicated minister,  Doreen Sioka.

Ministers
All gender equality and social welfare ministers in chronological order are:

References

External links
Official website Ministry of Gender Equality, Poverty Eradication and Social Welfare

Gender equality and social welfare
Gender equality and social welfare
Economy of Namibia
Namibian culture
2000 establishments in Namibia